Curtain Call 2 is the second greatest hits album by American rapper Eminem, released on August 5, 2022, by Aftermath Entertainment, Shady Records, and Interscope Records. A double album, it is a successor of his previous greatest hits album, Curtain Call: The Hits, which was issued in 2005. The compilation covers the most recent years of Eminem's career, since his return to music from his hiatus, starting from the release of Relapse in 2009. The album also includes three new songs, "The King and I" featuring CeeLo Green (featured in the soundtrack of the film Elvis), "From the D 2 the LBC" featuring Snoop Dogg and "Is This Love ('09)" featuring 50 Cent.

Background and promotion 
Curtain Call 2 was first hinted at by Eminem in a tweet promoting the single "From the D 2 the LBC" on June 24, 2022, in which he included a hashtag with the album's name. Eminem officially announced the album and its release date via social media on July 11. On July 19, the album was made available for preorder through Eminem's website along with several merch bundles and limited edition vinyls. On August 2, the album's track listing was unveiled.

Cover art 
On July 11, 2022, Eminem revealed the album's cover art on Twitter. The artwork emulates classic pinball machine-style artwork and contains many hidden Easter eggs as well as references to his previous albums. Some of the references include a fighter jet from Kamikaze and Eminem's childhood home from The Marshall Mathers LP 2.

Critical reception 

Curtain Call 2 was met with generally favorable reviews from critics. At Metacritic, which assigns a normalized rating out of 100 to reviews from mainstream publications, the album received an average score of 74, based on four reviews.

AllMusic's Stephen Thomas Erlewine praised the album, saying that it is "generous to a fault, playing like an endless streaming playlist instead of a curated compilation, yet it does feature many highlights from Eminem's mid-career records". Grant Jones of RapReviews.com wrote: "The 'Eminem sound' the first Curtain Call could accurately collate and celebrate (given 100% of it was produced by either Dre or Em) has been pushed aside in favor of party trick flows and quick-win hooks from guests. It still seems to be a successful approach, but it's not as satisfying to revisit". Drew Millard of Pitchfork stated: "despite showcasing some of Eminem's stylistic growing pains, Curtain Call 2 isn't completely lined with duds". In his mixed review, Robin Murray of Clash wrote: "Curtain Call 2 is at its most engaging when the Detroit figure simply cuts back on the Billboard tie-ins, and reminds us all why he became such a revered rapper in the first place. ... As a project, however, Curtain Call 2 is weighed down by its flaws. There's no ignoring the wayward path Eminem has taken over the past two decades, and the tracklisting reflects this".

Commercial performance 
The album debuted at number six on the US Billboard 200, earning 43,000 album-equivalent units in its first week. Curtain Call 2 was the best-selling album of the week in pure sales, with 18,000 copies sold. It also debuted at number three on the UK Albums Chart.
The album has moved a total of 700,000 album-equivalent units as of October 26th, 2022, including 32,900 pure album sales, 132,100 sing sales, 830 million audio-on-demand streams, and 130 million video-on-demand streams according to HitsDailyDouble.

Track listing

Charts

Weekly charts

Year-end charts

Certifications

References

External links

2022 greatest hits albums
Eminem compilation albums
Albums produced by Eminem
Aftermath Entertainment compilation albums
Aftermath Entertainment albums
Shady Records compilation albums
Interscope Records compilation albums